The Veteran is a 2011 British crime thriller film directed by Matthew Hope and starring Toby Kebbell, Brian Cox, Tony Curran and Adi Bielski.

Plot 
Robert Miller, a veteran paratrooper, is returning from the war in Afghanistan to his home in a violent decaying South London Heygate Estate, overrun by gun-toting youth gangs. The gangs are led by a drug lord gangster Jones who is interested in Miller working for him, but his job offer is rejected.

Through an ex-army mate, Miller finds work in undercover surveillance. He is soon recruited by a couple of shady government operatives for an undercover operation to keep tabs on a network of suspected terrorist cells. Embedded in the terrorist group is a Lebanese-born British citizen informant.

Miller soon discovers that the security forces and the intelligence services are not quite what they seem. He uncovers a conspiracy the government is planning to set off a series of coordinated attacks to renew fear of terrorism to help them benefit from the GOD policy - Guns, Oil, and Drugs. Miller finds out that all his surveillance was simply to confirm the go ahead for the attacks. The government needs funding and the GOD policy had been instated for years. Miller finds out that this links with the local gang terrorising his neighbourhood being linked with the terrorist cells.

Miller attacks and kills most of Jones' men, but also accidentally shoots an innocent woman. He ends up being shot dead by a young kid that Miller had previously been trying to get out of Jones' gang.

Cast 
 Toby Kebbell as Robert Miller
 Brian Cox as Gerry
 Tony Curran as Chris Turner
 Adi Bielski as Alayna Wallace
 Tom Brooke as Danny Turner
 Selva Rasalingam as Fawwaz
 Ashley Bashy Thomas as Tyrone Jones
 Mem Ferda as Hakeem
 Ivanno Jeremiah as Fahad Sahal
 Eboseta Ayemere as Ryan Sahal

Production

Reception
On Rotten Tomatoes the film has a score of 60% based on reviews from 20 critics, with an average rating of 5.22 out of 10.

References

External links 
 

2011 action films
2011 films
British action films
Films shot at Elstree Film Studios
Films about terrorism
2010s English-language films
2010s British films